The United States Court of International Trade (case citations: Ct. Int'l Trade) is a U.S. federal court that adjudicates civil actions arising out of U.S. customs and international trade laws. Seated in New York City, it exercises broad jurisdiction over most trade-related matters, and is permitted to hear and decide cases anywhere in the country, as well as abroad.

The court originated with the Customs Administrative Act of 1890, which established the Board of General Appraisers as a quasi-judicial entity of the U.S. Treasury Department tasked with hearing disputes primarily concerning tariffs and import duties. In 1926, Congress replaced the Board with the United States Customs Court, an administrative tribunal with greater judicial functions, which in 1930 was made independent of the Treasury Department. In 1956, the U.S. Customs Court was reconstituted by Congress as an Article III tribunal, giving it the status and privileges of a federal court. The Customs Courts Act of 1980 established the U.S. Court of International Trade in its current form, granting it jurisdiction over all trade matters and conferring its judges with life tenure.

The court's subject matter jurisdiction is limited to particular questions in international trade and customs law, though it may also decide any civil action against the U.S. government, its officers, or its agencies arising out of any law connected to international trade. As an Article III tribunal, the U.S. Court of International Trade can decide controversies in both law and equity, and is thus allowed to grant relief in virtually all means available, including money judgments, writs of mandamus, and preliminary or permanent injunctions.

Led by a chief judge, the court is composed of nine judges who are appointed by the U.S. president and confirmed by the Senate. No more than five judges can be of the same political party.  Cases are typically heard by just one judge, and the court operates on procedures and protocols drawn heavily from the Federal Rules of Civil Procedure.

History 

In 1890, the United States Congress passed legislation creating the Board of General Appraisers, a quasi-judicial administrative unit within the United States Department of the Treasury. The Board had nine members appointed by the President of the United States and empowered to review decisions of United States Customs officials concerning the amount of duties to be paid on importations.

In 1926, Congress responded to the increasing number and complexity of customs cases by replacing the Board of General Appraisers with the United States Customs Court, an independent Article I tribunal, retaining the jurisdiction and powers of the Board of General Appraisers. In 1928, the United States Customs Court became the first federal tribunal in the United States to have a woman judge, when President Calvin Coolidge nominated Genevieve R. Cline to the court. Although many members of the United States Senate objected to Cline's appointment, both because of her sex, and because they believed she was self-taught and had no judicial experience, her supporters advocated strongly for her, including Katherine Pike, president of the National Association of Women Lawyers and a number of club-women. Cline won U.S. Senate confirmation on May 25, 1928, received her commission on May 26, 1928, and took her oath of office in the Cleveland Federal Building on June 5, 1928.

On July 14, 1956, Congress made the United States Customs Court an Article III tribunal, again without changing its jurisdiction, powers, or procedures. After making some procedural changes in the Customs Courts Act of 1970, Congress addressed substantive issues concerning the court's jurisdiction and remedial powers in the Customs Courts Act of 1980, which broadened the power of the court and renamed it the United States Court of International Trade.

Courthouse 

The James L. Watson Court of International Trade Building, located on Foley Square in lower Manhattan in New York City, houses the court.  Also known as 1 Federal Plaza, it was built in 1968 adjacent to the Jacob K. Javits Federal Building. In 2003, the building was named in honor of James L. Watson, a judge of the United States Customs Court from 1964 to 1980, and of the Court of International Trade from 1980 to 2001.

Jurisdiction 

The court possesses limited subject matter jurisdiction, meaning that it may hear only cases involving particular international trade and customs law questions. For example, the court hears disputes such as those involving protests filed with U.S. Customs and Border Protection, decisions regarding Trade Adjustment Assistance by the United States Department of Labor or United States Department of Agriculture, customs broker licensing, and disputes relating to determinations made by the United States International Trade Commission and the Department of Commerce's International Trade Administration regarding anti-dumping and countervailing duties.

There is one notable exception to the court's jurisdiction. In cases involving antidumping and countervailing duties imposed on Canadian or Mexican merchandise, an interested party can request that the case be heard before a special ad hoc binational panel organized under Chapter 19 of the 1994 North American Free Trade Agreement.

Procedure 

Most cases are heard by a single judge. If a case challenges the constitutionality of a U.S. law or has important implications regarding the administration or interpretation of the customs laws, then it may be heard by a three-judge panel. Many Judges of the Court of International Trade also regularly sit by designation on three-judge panels of the United States courts of appeals.

Although the Court maintains its own rules of procedure, they are patterned for the most part on the Federal Rules of Civil Procedure. The court has held that decisions interpreting the Federal Rules of Civil Procedure are "instructive" in interpreting its own rules.

Current composition of the court 
:

Vacancies and pending nominations

Former judges of the United States Court of International Trade

Former judges of the United States Customs Court

Former members of the Board of General Appraisers

Chief judges 

Chief judges have administrative responsibilities with respect to the Court of International Trade, and preside over any panel on which they serve unless circuit judges are also on the panel. Unlike the Supreme Court, where one justice is specifically nominated to be chief, the office of chief judge rotates among the court judges. To be chief, a judge must have been in active service on the court for at least one year, be under the age of 65, and have not previously served as chief judge. A vacancy is filled by the judge highest in seniority among the group of qualified judges. The chief judge serves for a term of seven years or until age 70, whichever occurs first. The age restrictions are waived if no members of the court would otherwise be qualified for the position.

Under the Board of General Appraisers, the position of Chief Judge was entitled "President". When the office was created in 1948, the chief judge was the longest-serving judge who had not elected to retire on what has since 1958 been known as senior status or declined to serve as chief judge. After August 6, 1959, judges could not become or remain chief after turning 70 years old. The current rules have been in operation since October 1, 1982.

Succession of seats

References

External links 

 United States Court of International Trade, official site
 History of the court from the Federal Judicial Center

 
1980 establishments in New York City
United States trade policy
Federal courthouses in the United States
Government buildings in Manhattan
Civic Center, Manhattan
Courts and tribunals established in 1980